Pontosaurus is a now extinct genus of pythonomorph from the Late Cretaceous period. It was originally named Hydrosaurus, but that name was preoccupied by an agamid lizard, so it was renamed. It is known from two species, both Cenomanian in age, the type P. lesinensis which is known from Hvar in Croatia, the other P. kornhuberi is known from the Sannine Formation in Lebanon. Both species were relatively small.

See also

 List of mosasaurs

References

External links
 Oceans of Kansas

Mosasaurs
Extinct reptiles of New Zealand
Mosasaurs of Asia
Fossil taxa described in 1892
Taxa named by Dragutin Gorjanović-Kramberger